Funjabbi Chak De is a Hindi entertainment comedy show that aired on STAR One. Hosted by Navjot Singh Sidhu and Mandira Bedi, the show features celebrity singers, chatting, music, stand up comedians, and entertaining performers.

References

Indian comedy television series
Star One (Indian TV channel) original programming
Indian stand-up comedy television series
2007 Indian television series debuts
2008 Indian television series endings